Harnell is a surname. Notable people with the surname include: 

 Jess Harnell (born 1963), American voice actor and singer
 Joe Harnell (1924–2005), American composer, musician, and music arranger
 Tony Harnell (born 1962), American rock singer

See also
 Farnell
 Harrell (name)